Callan Ward (born 10 April 1990) is a professional Australian rules footballer playing for the Greater Western Sydney Giants in the Australian Football League (AFL). He previously played for the Western Bulldogs from 2008 to 2011. Ward received a nomination for the 2009 AFL Rising Star award in round 18 of the 2009 season. He was one of three inaugural Giants co-captains, leading the club for eight seasons, and is also the club's games record holder with 211 games.

Early life
Ward is the grandson of former South Melbourne captain Bill Gunn, who played 104 games for the club between 1952 and 1959. Leading into the 2007 AFL draft, five player managers vied to represent him, and a week out from the draft he decided on Paul Connors, who also represented Chris Judd. Ward was selected by the Bulldogs with their second selection (number 19 overall) after being a mere 20 days old enough to nominate for the draft.

AFL career

Western Bulldogs (2008–2011)
Ward made his debut against  in round 11 of the 2008 season, collecting 12 disposals and finishing with one goal. In his debut year, he played six games while juggling full-time football and his last year of high school. Having earned a regular spot in the team in 2009, Ward went on to have a breakout season, playing 22 games and earning an AFL Rising Star nomination for his performance against  in round 18. Ward missed the first half of the 2010 season through injury, but returned to play the rest of the season and finals series. Ward had his best season for the Bulldogs in 2011, playing in all 22 games and averaging 21 disposals, including a 29-disposal, best-on-ground performance against  in round 13.

Greater Western Sydney (2012–present)

On 5 September 2011, Ward announced that he had signed with the Greater Western Sydney Giants; he was the second player to publicly announce his commitment to the new franchise club. Ward was also announced as one of three inaugural co-captains for the club, alongside Phil Davis and Luke Power. On 24 March 2012, in the Giants' debut AFL match against , he kicked the Giants' first ever goal. Ward went on to win the Giants' inaugural best-and-fairest award, named the Kevin Sheedy Medal after their coach, Kevin Sheedy.

Ward enjoyed a solid season in 2013, despite the club winning only one game for the year; Ward was named best-on-ground for his 31 disposals and four goals in that game, against . Ward followed up with another consistent season in 2014, in which he polled fifteen Brownlow Medal votes.

Ward had a career-best season in 2015, playing all 22 games and averaging 25 disposals, and polling a club-record nineteen Brownlow votes. Ward had another consistent season in 2016, during which the Giants made finals for the first time, securing their first finals win against Sydney, and fell six points short of making the Grand Final after losing to Ward's former club, the Western Bulldogs. Ward played all 25 games the following season, averaging 27 disposals.

In 2018, Ward played his 200th game in round 8 against , and played his 150th game for the Giants (becoming the first player to do so) in round 19 against St Kilda. Ward sustained a knee injury during the 2019 pre-season, meaning that he would miss the first few rounds of the season and his consecutive games streak would end at 95 games. He returned against  in round 4; however, five minutes into the game, he suffered an anterior cruciate ligament injury, ruling him out for the rest of the season. He later began assisting Giants coach Leon Cameron on the interchange bench during matches while recovering from his injury. In December 2019, Stephen Coniglio took over the captaincy of the Giants from Ward and Davis.

Ward made a successful return from injury in round 2 of the 2020 season against . He missed the round 5 match against Hawthorn due to soreness, before suffering a right knee injury upon his return against  the following week.

Statistics
Updated to the end of round 1, 2023.

|-
| 2008 ||  || 14
| 6 || 2 || 0 || 28 || 32 || 60 || 18 || 10 || 0.3 || 0.0 || 4.7 || 5.3 || 10.0 || 3.0 || 1.7 || 0
|-
| 2009 ||  || 14
| 22 || 18 || 13 || 178 || 184 || 362 || 70 || 86 || 0.8 || 0.6 || 8.1 || 8.4 || 16.5 || 3.2 || 3.9 || 0
|-
| 2010 ||  || 14
| 10 || 1 || 4 || 76 || 97 || 173 || 36 || 34 || 0.1 || 0.4 || 7.6 || 9.7 || 17.3 || 3.6 || 3.4 || 0
|-
| 2011 ||  || 14
| 22 || 12 || 11 || 204 || 253 || 457 || 74 || 96 || 0.5 || 0.5 || 9.3 || 11.5 || 20.8 || 3.4 || 4.4 || 6
|-
| 2012 ||  || 8
| 20 || 8 || 11 || 278 || 210 || 488 || 86 || 100 || 0.4 || 0.6 || 13.9 || 10.5 || 24.4 || 4.3 || 5.0 || 5
|-
| 2013 ||  || 8
| 21 || 11 || 6 || 247 || 242 || 489 || 95 || 94 || 0.5 || 0.3 || 11.8 || 11.5 || 23.3 || 4.5 || 4.5 || 4
|-
| 2014 ||  || 8
| 20 || 7 || 10 || 240 || 258 || 498 || 75 || 115 || 0.4 || 0.5 || 12.0 || 12.9 || 24.9 || 3.8 || 5.8 || 15
|-
| 2015 ||  || 8
| 22 || 10 || 7 || 253 || 303 || 556 || 103 || 115 || 0.5 || 0.3 || 11.5 || 13.8 || 25.3 || 4.7 || 5.2 || 19
|-
| 2016 ||  || 8
| 24 || 16 || 12 || 272 || 287 || 559 || 82 || 109 || 0.7 || 0.5 || 11.3 || 12.0 || 23.3 || 3.4 || 4.5 || 12
|-
| 2017 ||  || 8
| 25 || 14 || 10 || 353 || 324 || 677 || 90 || 98 || 0.6 || 0.4 || 14.1 || 13.0 || 27.1 || 3.6 || 3.9 || 11
|-
| 2018 ||  || 8
| 24 || 8 || 15 || 318 || 324 || 642 || 92 || 95 || 0.3 || 0.6 || 13.3 || 13.5 || 26.8 || 3.8 || 4.0 || 13
|-
| 2019 ||  || 8
| 1 || 0 || 0 || 1 || 0 || 1 || 0 || 0 || 0.0 || 0.0 || 1.0 || 0.0 || 1.0 || 0.0 || 0.0 || 0
|-
| 2020 ||  || 8
| 7 || 3 || 1 || 56 || 48 || 104 || 16 || 11 || 0.4 || 0.1 || 8.0 || 6.9 || 14.9 || 2.3 || 1.6 || 0
|-
| 2021 ||  || 8
| 24 || 15 || 5 || 278 || 267 || 545 || 90 || 71 || 0.6 || 0.2 || 11.6 || 11.1 || 22.7 || 3.8 || 3.0 || 8
|-
| 2022 ||  || 8
| 22 || 8 || 7 || 248 || 229 || 477 || 103 || 58 || 0.4 || 0.3 || 11.3 || 10.4 || 21.7 || 4.7 || 2.6 || 1
|-
| 2023 ||  || 8
| 1 || 1 || 2 || 12 || 19 || 31 || 4 || 0 || 1.0 || 2.0 || 12.0 || 19.0 || 31.0 || 4.0 || 0.0 || 
|- class=sortbottom
! colspan=3 | Career
! 271 !! 134 !! 114 !! 3042 !! 3077 !! 6119 !! 1034 !! 1092 !! 0.5 !! 0.4 !! 11.2 !! 11.4 !! 22.6 !! 3.8 !! 4.0 !! 94
|}

Notes

Honours and achievements
 Greater Western Sydney Giants co-captain: 2012–2019
 Greater Western Sydney games record holder
 Kevin Sheedy Medal: 2012
 Robert Rose Award: 2018
 2× Brett Kirk Medal: 2014 (game 1), 2017 (game 2)
 Australia representative honours in international rules football: 2011
 22under22 team: 2012
 AFL Rising Star nominee: 2009

References

External links

 
 

1990 births
Living people
Australian rules footballers from Victoria (Australia)
Western Bulldogs players
Western Jets players
Greater Western Sydney Giants players
Kevin Sheedy Medal winners
Australia international rules football team players